Weston Point Docks, also known as the Port of Weston, is an inland port on the Manchester Ship Canal in the town of Runcorn, Cheshire, England. It is operated by FLX Logistics.

History

In 1810, the Weaver Navigation Company completed the Weston Canal between Frodsham and the Weston Point area of Runcorn to avoid the difficult entrance to the mouth of the River Weaver, and a dock was established at Weston Point. The Old Basin is still extant but no longer accessible to shipping. The New Basin, built between 1850 and 1856, was filled in between 1963 and 1966.

In 1841, an Anglican church, Christ Church, was constructed on the site of the docks, now redundant but a listed building.

In 1859, a short section of canal called the Runcorn and Weston Canal was built which would link Weston Point Docks on the Weston Canal with Runcorn Docks on the Bridgewater Canal.

Two further docks, the Delamere (1865-1870) and the Tollemache (1885), were built and now form one dock, the Delamache.

The Manchester Ship Canal opened in 1894. This canal now services the docks as opposed to the Weston Canal and the Weaver Navigation.

Present
In August 2007, the owners of the Port of Weston, The Westbury Property Fund, merged with the Eddie Stobart Group to form the Stobart Group. The group planned to develop the site into an inter-modal port facility to enable freight, currently carried by road, to be transported by rail and water. This would mean increased warehousing, new container handling facilities, an extension to the existing West Coast Main Line rail siding, a new link road, and improved navigable access between the dock and the Manchester Ship Canal. The plans were not implemented, however, and the docks are now operated by FLX Logistics.

See also 
Runcorn Docks

References

External links
FLX Logistics

Ports and harbours of Cheshire
Runcorn
Mersey docks
1810 establishments in England